Lieutenant General Sir Bertram Norman Sergison-Brooke,  (born Brooke; 20 July 1880 – 26 March 1967) was an Anglo-Irish senior British Army officer who served as Major-General commanding the Brigade of Guards and General Officer Commanding (GOC) London District.

Early life and education
Brooke was born in London, the fourth son of Arthur Basil Brooke and Alice Georgina Norton. He was a grandson of Sir Arthur Brooke, 2nd Baronet. The Brookes were a prominent Anglo-Irish family that had been settled in Northern Ireland since prior to the Plantation of Ulster. He was educated at Eton College and passed out of the Royal Military College, Sandhurst in 1899.

Military career
Brooke was commissioned into the Grenadier Guards as a second lieutenant on 12 August 1899. He served in the Second Boer War in South Africa, and was promoted to lieutenant on 14 December 1900. Following the end of the war in June 1902 he returned with most of the men of the guards regiments on board the SS Lake Michigan, which arrived in Southampton in October 1902. He then served with the Egyptian Army.

He also served in the First World War, initially as Assistant Embarkation Officer in Southampton and then as a brigade major in France. By 1917 he was commanding 2nd Guards Brigade but was gassed on the Western Front. He was mentioned in dispatches seven times throughout the war.

After the war he became Commanding Officer of the 1st Battalion Grenadier Guards and then, in 1923, went on to be Commander of the Grenadier Guards and Regimental District. He was appointed Commander of 15th Infantry Brigade in China in 1927 and then Commander of the 1st (Guards) Brigade at Aldershot in 1928. He was made Brigadier on the General Staff at Eastern Command in India in 1931 and Major-General commanding the Brigade of Guards and General Officer Commanding London District in 1934. He retired in 1939 but, with the Second World War underway, he was recalled as General Officer Commanding (GOC) London District. He retired again in 1942.

He was British Red Cross Commissioner with the Allied Army of Liberation from 1943 to 1945.

Personal life
In 1915, he married Prudence Ida Evelyn Sergison, daughter and co-heiress of Charles Warden Sergison of Cuckfield Park, and assumed her surname by royal licence. They had one daughter, Patience Ann (born 1916), who married Sir Edward Henry Windley.

After Prudence's death in 1918, he married secondly Hilda Fenwick, in 1923. They had one son, Timothy Mark, who married Hon. Mary Anne Hare, daughter of John Hare, 1st Viscount Blakenham. His second wife died in 1954.

His home was in Slaugham in West Sussex.

References

Bibliography

External links
Generals of World War II

 

|-
 

1880 births
1967 deaths
Burials in Gloucestershire
Military personnel from London
People educated at Eton College
Graduates of the Royal Military College, Sandhurst
Knights Commander of the Order of the Bath
Knights Commander of the Royal Victorian Order
Companions of the Order of St Michael and St George
Companions of the Distinguished Service Order
Grenadier Guards officers
British Army lieutenant generals
British Army generals of World War II
British Army personnel of the Second Boer War
British Army generals of World War I
Red Cross personnel
People from Slaugham